The United States Penitentiary, Tucson (USP Tucson) is a high-security United States federal prison for male inmates in Arizona. It is part of the Tucson Federal Correctional Complex (FCC Tucson) and is operated by the Federal Bureau of Prisons, a division of the United States Department of Justice. The facility also has a satellite prison camp for minimum-security male offenders.

History
The Federal Bureau of Prisons drafted a report on March 28, 2001 naming Tucson as an ideal site for a new federal prison housing either 1,100 medium security or 1,000 high security inmates. A hearing was arranged the following May.

Construction was completed in 2005 at a cost of about $100 million, but additional preparations took over a year before inmates could be received.  The  facility is situated on a  property and designed for 1,500 inmates, though officials had at one time planned to limit the population to around 960. The minimum-security work camp provides labor for day-to-day operations of the federal prison complex. It has been described as "its own little city" by Josias Salazar, executive assistant of the prison complex. The opening of the penitentiary on February 5, 2007 worsened a local shortage of prison officers and was cited by residents for adding to the street traffic generated by the various prison facilities.

Sex Offender Management Program
USP Tucson is one of several federal prisons that offers a Sex Offender Management Program (SOMP) and therefore has a higher proportion of sex offenders in its general population. Having a larger number of sex offenders at SOMP facilities ensures that inmates feel safe about participating in treatment. USP Tucson offers a Non-Residential Sex Offender Treatment Program (SOTP-NR), which is a moderate intensity program designed for low to moderate risk sexual offenders. Many of the inmates in the SOTP-NR are first-time offenders serving a sentence for an Internet sex crime. All SOMP institutions offer the SOTP-NR. Eligible
inmates are transferred to a SOMP facility based on their treatment needs and security level. USP Tucson houses several high-profile sex offenders.

Notable incidents
The penitentiary went into lockdown on May 28, 2009 after several inmates were hospitalized from fights involving improvised weapons. Another inmate, Joseph William Nichols, was sentenced to 33 more months after being caught on August 12, 2009 with a concealed plastic shank that had been fashioned from his prison chair. A search of the kitchen where Nichols had been assigned resulted in the discovery of hidden contraband packages containing weapons and drug paraphernalia.

Media coverage
In July 2010, a San Diego CityBeat reporter mailed former congressman Randy "Duke" Cunningham to inquire about his time at the prison's work camp halfway into his 100-month sentence for tax evasion, conspiracy to commit bribery, mail fraud and wire fraud. Cunningham, who has become an advocate of prison reform, responded in a handwritten letter that he spends his days there teaching fellow inmates to obtain their GED. He wrote: "[Too] many students have severe learning disabilities from either drugs or genetic[s]. During the past 4 years only one of my students was unable to graduate—I taught him life skills, using a calculator to add, subtract, [multiply and divide]. This way he could at least balance a check book."

Notable inmates (current and former)
Inmates who were released from custody prior to 1982 are not listed on the Bureau of Prisons website.

High-profile

Political figures

Terrorists

Organized crime figures

Others

See also

 List of U.S. federal prisons
 Federal Bureau of Prisons
 Incarceration in the United States
 Sex offender registries in the United States

References

External links
USP Tucson at the Federal Bureau of Prisons (Official site)

While imprisoned, Pickard authored the acclaimed memoir "The Rose Of Paracelsus: On Secrets and Sacraments" http://www.createspace.com/5377339

2007 establishments in Arizona
Buildings and structures in Tucson, Arizona
Tucson
Tucson